Misfire is a 2014 American action film produced and directed by R. Ellis Frazier. The film stars Gary Daniels and Vannessa Vasquez in lead roles. The film was released on DVD in October 2014.

Plot
The film centers around a seasoned Drug Enforcement Administration agent Cole (Daniels), who descends into the underworld of Tijuana drug mafia in search of his journalist ex-wife who he believes has been abducted by a charismatic drug cartel boss with aspirations for public office.

Cast
 Gary Daniels as Cole
 Vannessa Vasquez as Gracie
 Michael Greco as Johnny
 Luis Gratia as Raul Montenegro
 Geoffrey Ross as Fitz
 Alma Cruz as Sarah

Reception
Eoin Friel from the Action Elite website gave the film 3.5 stars out of 5, writing that "overall, despite a slow start, Misfire is an engaging action thriller with a first rate performance from Gary Daniels and there is enough action to please genre fans". Friel particularly praised Vasquez's role as Gracie, noting that she "is jaw-droppingly gorgeous and incredibly likeable ...; she managed to be tough and sympathetic which isn’t easy to pull off".

James Simpson from Infernal Cinema wrote: "Entertaining and exciting in places due to its action scenes, Misfire is a short and sweet affair". Simpson noted that "Misfire appears to be part of a new wave of action and thriller movies that have cropped up since The Bourne Identity".

References

2014 films
2014 action films
2014 direct-to-video films
2010s English-language films
American action films
American direct-to-video films
Direct-to-video action films
Films about the Drug Enforcement Administration
Films about Mexican drug cartels
Films scored by Larry Groupé
Films set in Tijuana
2010s American films